Karen Sisco is an American crime drama television series starring Carla Gugino in the title role. The series was created by novelist Elmore Leonard, based on a character who had appeared in several of his written works, as well as one film adaptation, 1998's Out of Sight. The series debuted on October 1, 2003 on ABC, and was canceled after ten episodes.

As a U.S. Deputy Marshal, based on Miami, Florida's Gold Coast, Karen must deal with the underbelly of South Beach nightlife and Palm Beach high life while tracking down fugitives. She also struggles to win the respect of her fellow officers. Karen occasionally gets advice from her father, a retired Miami police officer turned private investigator, who is Karen’s confidant, counselor, and confessor. The show faced stiff competition from NBC's Law & Order.

TV Guide included the series in their 2013 list of 60 shows that were "Canceled Too Soon".

Character history
Prior to the events of the series, the character appeared in two stories:
 "Karen Makes Out", a 1996 short story, available in two collections: Murder for Love, and When the Women Come Out to Dance, and Other Stories
 Out of Sight, a 1996 novel, and 1998 film wherein she was played by Jennifer Lopez, and Marshall Sisco was played by Dennis Farina.

Cast
 Carla Gugino as Karen Sisco
 Robert Forster as Marshall Sisco, Karen's father
 Bill Duke as Amos Andrews, Karen's boss

Recurring
 Jeffrey De Serrano as Edwards
 Frank Pesce as Sonny
 Robert Deacon as Mordecai Jones
 Obba Babatundé as Daniel Burden
 Jake Mailey as Jethro

Production
Jason Smilovic and Peter Lefcourt were co-executive producers and writers, with Smilovic having developed the series. Scott Frank, nominated for an Oscar for Best Adapted Screenplay for Out Of Sight, served as an executive consultant.

Episodes

International broadcasting

  – HRT
  – TF1
  – TVN
  – ITV3 & ITV1
  Asia – Star World
  Middle East – MBC Action
  – Star Channel
  – Kanal 5
  – Rede Globo
  – SubTV & MTV3
  – bTV
  – Kanal A
  – Radio Televisyen Malaysia 2
  – STAR World India

Connections to other media
Gugino appeared as "Karen Goodall" in the second episode of the third season of Justified, which is also based on a work by Leonard. There, the character had been promoted to Assistant Director in the Marshals Service, and had married and divorced, taking and keeping the last name Goodall. This name change was necessary as FX did not own the rights to the Karen Sisco character, or her stories.

References

External links
 

2003 American television series debuts
2003 American television series endings
2000s American crime drama television series
2000s American police procedural television series
American Broadcasting Company original programming
English-language television shows
Sisco, Karen
Television shows based on books
Live action television shows based on films
Television series by Universal Television
Television shows set in Miami
United States Marshals Service in fiction